(in Medieval Latin, corresponding to Old English þēodisc, Old High German  diutisc and other early Germanic reflexes of Proto-Germanic *þiudiskaz, meaning "popular" or "of the people") was a term used in the early Middle Ages to refer to the West Germanic languages. The Latin term was borrowed from the Germanic adjective meaning "of the people" but, unlike it, was used only to refer to languages. In Medieval Western Europe non-native Latin was the language of science, church and administration, hence Latin theodiscus and its Germanic counterparts were used as antonyms of Latin, to refer to the "native language spoken by the general populace". They were subsequently used in the Frankish Empire to denote the native Germanic vernaculars. As such, they were no longer used as antonym of Latin, but of walhisk, a language descendant from Latin, but nevertheless the speech of the general populace as well. In Romance languages the same word yielded the Italian word for "German", and the old French word used for Dutch or, depending on the locality, German speakers, .

Etymology
Theodiscus is derived from West Germanic *þiudisk, from Proto-Germanic . The Proto-Indo-European word  ("tribe", "people"), which is commonly reconstructed as the basis of the word, is related to Lithuanian  ("nation"), Old Irish  ("tribe", "people") and Oscan touto ("community").

It survives as the Icelandic word  for "people, nation", the Norwegian word  for "people", "nation", and the word "German" in many languages including German , Dutch , Yiddish , Danish , Norwegian , Swedish  and Italian .  

The word , a neologism for a branch of Germanic neopaganism, is based on the Gothic form of the word, where  also took on the meaning of "pagan", a Judeo-Christian calque on similar formations such as "Gentile" from Latin gens ("people") and Hebrew goy, i.e. "belonging to (other) peoples".

While morphologically similar, the Latin root  for "Germanic" is more distantly related, and originally a name of a Celtic or Germanic tribe that inhabited coastal Germany.
In modern Welsh it is seen in words such as 'alltud' (exile) from 'allan' (outward) and Breton 'tud' (people).

Semantic development within English 
Currently, the first known attestation of theodiscus is to be found in a letter written around the year 786 by the Bishop of Ostia. In the letter, the bishop writes to Pope Adrian I about a synod taking place in Corbridge, England; where the decisions were later read aloud elsewhere "tam Latine quam theodisce", meaning "in Latin as well as the vernacular / common tongue". Rendered in Old English as þēodisc, the term was primarily used as an adjective concerning the language of the laity. It was rarely used as a descriptor of ethnicity or identity, as the Anglo-Saxons referred to themselves as Seaxe, Iutas or Engle, respectively meaning Saxons, Jutes and Angles. The latter term would later give rise to the adjective , which during the Early Middle Ages become the term for all speakers of the Germanic dialects now collectively known as Old English.

By the late 14th century, þēodisc had given rise to Middle English duche and its variants, which were used as a blanket term for all the non-Scandinavian Germanic languages spoken on the European mainland. Historical linguists have noted that the medieval "Duche" itself most likely shows an external Middle Dutch influence, in that it shows a voiced alveolar stop rather than the expected voiced dental fricative. This would be a logical result of the Medieval English wool trade, which brought the English in close linguistic contact with the cloth merchants living in the Dutch-speaking cities of Bruges and Ghent, who at the time, referred to their language as dietsc.

Its exact meaning is dependent on context, but tends to be vague regardless. When concerning language, the word duche could be used as a hypernym for several languages (The North est Contrey which lond spekyn all maner Duche tonge — The North [of Europe] is an area, in which all lands speak all manner of "Dutch" languages) but it could also suggest singular use (In Duche a rudder is a knyght – In "Dutch" a rudder [cf. Dutch: ridder] is a knight) in which case linguistic and/or geographic pointers need to be used to determine or approximate what the author would have meant in modern terms, which can be difficult. For example, in his poem Constantyne, the English chronicler John Hardyng (1378–1465) specifically mentions the inhabitants of three Dutch-speaking fiefdoms (Flanders, Guelders and Brabant) as travel companions, but also lists the far more general "Dutchemēne" and "Almains", the latter term having an almost equally broad meaning, though being more restricted in its geographical use; usually referring to people and localities within modern Germany, Switzerland and Austria:    

By early 17th century, general use of the word Dutch had become exceedingly rare in Great Britain and it became an exonym specifically tied to the modern Dutch, i.e. the Dutch-speaking inhabitants of the Low Countries. Many factors facilitated this, including close geographic proximity, trade and military conflicts. Due to the latter, "Dutch" also became pejorative label pinned by English speakers on almost anything they regard as inferior, irregular, or contrary to their own practice. Examples include "Dutch treat" (each person paying for himself), "Dutch courage" (boldness inspired by alcohol), "Dutch wife" (a type of sex doll) and "Double Dutch" (gibberish, nonsense) among others.

In the United States, the word "Dutch" remained somewhat ambiguous until the start of the 19th century. Generally, it referred to the Dutch, their language or the Dutch Republic, but it was also used as an informal monniker (for example in the works of James Fenimore Cooper and Washington Irving) for people who would today be considered Germans or German-speaking, most notably the Pennsylvania Dutch. This lingering ambiguity was most likely caused by close proximity to German-speaking immigrants, who referred to themselves or (in the case of the Pennsylvania Dutch) their language as "Deutsch" or "Deitsch".

Semantic development within Dutch
From Old Dutch *thiudisk a southern variant duutsc and a western variant dietsc developed in Middle Dutch. In the earliest sources, its primary use was to differentiate between Germanic and the Romance dialects, as expressed by the Middle Dutch poet Jan van Boendale, who wrote:

During the High Middle Ages "Dietsc/Duutsc" was increasingly used as an umbrella term for the specific Germanic dialects spoken in the Low Countries, its meaning being largely implicitly provided by the regional orientation of medieval Dutch society: apart from the higher echelons of the clergy and nobility, mobility was largely static and hence while "Dutch" could by extension also be used in its earlier sense, referring to what to today would be called Germanic dialects as opposed to Romance dialects, in many cases it was understood or meant to refer to the language now known as Dutch. Apart from the sparsely populated eastern borderlands, there was little to no contact with contemporary speakers of German dialects, let alone a concept of the existence of German as language in its modern sense among the Dutch. Because medieval trade focussed on travel by water and with the most heavily populated areas adjacent to Northwestern France, the average 15th century Dutchman stood a far greater chance of hearing French or English than a dialect of the German interior, despite its relative geographical closeness. Medieval Dutch authors had a vague, generalised sense of common linguistic roots between their language and various German dialects, but no concept of speaking the same language existed. Instead they saw their linguistic surroundings mostly in terms of small scale regiolects.

The 15th century saw the first attested use of "Nederlandsch" (Dutch: Netherlandish, Lowlandish) alongside "Duytsch" (the Early Modern spelling of the earlier "Dietsc/Duutsc") as a term for the Dutch language and it would eventually manifest itself as the main ethnonym. The use of "low(er)" or "nether" in describing the area now known as the Low Countries has a long historical record. In the 13th century epic the Nibelungenlied, written in Middle High German, the protagonist Sigurd is said to hail from the city of Xanten in the "Niderlant", meaning the Low Countries. In Old French, the inhabitants of the Low Countries were known as the "Avalois", meaning "those of the [Rhine/Scheldt/Meuse] estuary"; compare contemporary French "en aval" and "à vau-l'eau" meaning "downstream". The Dukes of Burgundy referred to their Dutch possessions as "pays d'embas" (French: "lower  lands") as opposed to their higher/upper territorial possessions in Burgundy itself, which was echoed in the Middle and Modern French "Pays-Bas" meaning "Low Countries". 

In the second half of the 16th century the neologism "Nederduytsch" (literally: Nether-Dutch, Low-Dutch) appeared in print, in a way combining the earlier "Duytsch" and "Nederlandsch" into one compound. The term was preferred by many leading contemporary grammarians such as Balthazar Huydecoper, Arnold Moonen and Jan ten Kate because it provided a continuity with Middle Dutch ("Duytsch" being the evolution of medieval "Dietsc"), was at the time considered the proper translation of the Roman Province of Germania Inferior (which not only encompassed much of the contemporary Dutch-speaking area / Netherlands, but also added classical prestige to the name) and amplified the dichotomy between Early Modern Dutch and the "Dutch" (German) dialects spoken around the Middle and Upper Rhine which had begun to be called overlantsch of hoogdutysch (literally:  Overlandish, High-"Dutch") by Dutch merchants sailing upriver. Though "Duytsch" forms part of the compound in both Nederduytsch and Hoogduytsch, this should not be taken to imply that the Dutch saw their language as being especially closely related to the German dialects spoken in Southerwestern Germany. On the contrary, the term "Hoogduytsch" specifically came into being as a special category because Dutch travelers visiting these parts found it hard to understand the local vernacular: in a letter dated to 1487 a Flemish merchant from Bruges instructs his agent to conduct trade transactions in Mainz in French, rather than the local tongue to avoid any misunderstandings. In 1571 use of "Nederduytsch" greatly increased because the Synod of Emden chose the name "Nederduytsch Hervormde Kerk" as the official designation of the Dutch Reformed Church. The synods choice of "Nederduytsch" over the more dominant "Nederlandsch", was inspired by the phonological similarities between "neder-" and "nederig" (the latter meaning "humble") and the fact that it did not contain a worldly element ("land"), whereas "Nederlandsch" did. 

As the Dutch increasingly referred to their own language as "Nederlandsch" or "Nederduytsch", the term "Duytsch" became more ambiguous. Dutch humanists, started to use "Duytsch" in a sense which would today be called "Germanic", for example in a dialogue recorded in the influential Dutch grammar book "Twe-spraack vande Nederduitsche letterkunst", published in 1584: 

Beginning in the second half 16th century, the nomenclature gradually became more fixed, with "Nederlandsch" and "Nederduytsch" becoming the preferred terms for Dutch and with "Hooghduytsch" referring to the language today called German. Initially the word "Duytsch" itself remained vague in exact meaning, but after the 1650s a trend emerges in which "Duytsch" is taken as the shorthand for "Hooghduytsch". This process was probably accelerated by the large number of Germans employed as agricultural day laborers and mercenary soldiers in the Dutch Republic and the ever increasing popularity of "Nederlandsch" and "Nederduytsch" over "Duytsch", the use of which had already been in decline for over a century, thereby acquiring its current meaning (German) in Dutch. 

While "Nederduytsch" briefly eclipsed the use of "Nederlandsch" during the 17th century, it always remained a somewhat officious, literary and scholarly term among the general populace and steadily started to lose ground to "Nederlandsch" in print after 1700. When, in 1815, the United Kingdom of the Netherlands was proclaimed, it was specifically noted that the official language of the kingdom was "Nederlandsch" and that the Dutch Reformed Church, as the official State Church, would be known as the "Nederlandsch Hervormde Kerk" resulting in a profound drop in the already declining use of the word. The Dutch-speaking Cape Colony came under British control two years prior in 1814, resulting in the continued use of "nederduytsch" by the Dutch Reformed Church in South Africa in its official nomenclature to the present day. The disappearance of "Nederduytsch", left "Nederlandsch", first documented in the 15th century, as the sole ethnonym for the Dutch language.   

The graph below visualises the decline of "Duytsch" and rise and decline of "Nederduytsch" as an ethnonym and the eventual dominance of "Nederlands":

In the late 19th century "Nederduits" was reintroduced to Dutch through the German language, where prominent linguists, such as the Brothers Grimm and Georg Wenker, in the nascent field of German and Germanic studies used the term to refer to Germanic dialects which had not taken part in the High German consonant shift. Initially this group consisted of Dutch, English, Low German and Frisian, but in modern scholarship only refers to Low German-varieties. Hence in contemporary Dutch, "Nederduits" is used to describe Low German varieties, specifically those spoken in Northern Germany as the varieties spoken in the eastern Netherlands, while related, are referred to as "Nedersaksisch". Likewise in the 19th century, the term "Diets" was revived by Dutch linguists and historians as a poetic name for Middle Dutch and its literature.

Semantic development within German
The second recorded use of "theodisca" as a reference to a Germanic language was Old High German. In 788, the Annals of the Frankish Kingdom report the punishment of a Bavarian duke: "quod theodisca lingua herisliz dictum", meaning "known in the language of the people as herisliz". Herisliz  is a German word now obsolete: the "slicing", i.e. tearing apart of the "Heer" (Desertion).

In German dialects, a large amount of forms of "theodiscus" existed throughout the Middle Ages and which all referred to either the broader Romance/Germanic dichotomy in the West and South or the Slavic/Germanic bipartition in the East. In Old High German both diutisk and diutisc are known, that developed in Middle High German as diutsc.

See also
 
 
 Teutons
 Furor Teutonicus
 Theodism
 Theodoric
 Walha
 Túath
 Name of the Goths

Notes

History of the Dutch language
History of the English language
History of the German language
Etymologies
Latin words and phrases